The New Mexico State Police (NMSP) is the law enforcement agency of the U.S. state of New Mexico. Administered by the New Mexico Department of Public Safety, it has jurisdiction anywhere in the state, often working in tandem with local and federal law enforcement. Founded in 1905, NMSP's official mission is to protect the lives, property and constitutional rights of the people of New Mexico.

History

World War I
During World War I, national security became a great concern, particularly in border states like New Mexico. The mounted police were reactivated and kept the border with Mexico secure, as well as provided general law enforcement services. For the next several years, the mounted police gained quite a reputation as an effective and professional police force, much to the disdain of the state's lawbreakers, who often had strong political ties in Santa Fe. Finally, on February 15, 1921, almost sixteen years after its inception, the New Mexico Mounted Police was abolished. In 1937, it was resurrected once again as a volunteer police organization. In 1941, New Mexico Governor John E. Miles made the volunteer police organization an official state law enforcement agency as it stands today called the New Mexico Mounted Patrol.

New Mexico Motor Patrol
The advent of the automobile again highlighted the need for a statewide law enforcement agency. No other police force had jurisdictional authority to enforce laws throughout the state. In 1933, the New Mexico Motor Patrol was established, primarily to enforce traffic laws. The patrol had a civilian oversight board consisting of Governor Arthur Seligman, Attorney General E.K. Neumann, and Highway Engineer Glenn D. Macy. The state of Texas had recently created their own motor patrol, and they detailed Captain Homer Garrison to conduct the first New Mexico Motor Patrol recruit school at St. Michael's College in Santa Fe. 135 men applied for the school, eighteen were selected to attend, and ten were finally chosen and commissioned as the first motor patrol officers. Each officer was issued a Harley Davidson motorcycle with siren, red light, and other accessories. One of the ten graduates, Earl Irish, was appointed as the Chief and was given a monthly salary of $150; Patrolmen made $125 monthly. Officers were allowed $10 per month to maintain their uniforms.

The Motor Patrol proved to be a great success and within a few months of its existence, had generated more than enough revenue to fund itself. A radio broadcasting system was set up that depended on a commercial radio station, KOB, in Albuquerque. Every week, officers would wire law enforcement matters to be disseminated to the chief in Santa Fe, who would see that KOB broadcast the information twice each day, except Sunday. In this way, motor patrol officers communicated information to each other such as descriptions of wanted suspects and stolen goods.

New Mexico State Police
By 1935, the need to expand the authority and responsibility of the motor patrol was widely recognized. The Twelfth State Legislature changed the name of the organization to the New Mexico State Police and gave its officers full police powers to enforce all laws of the state and complete statewide jurisdiction. The authorized strength was raised to 30 officers; the ranks of sergeant, lieutenant, and captain were added; and salaries were increased. The uniform adopted in 1936 is still in use today, with the exception of the riding breeches and boots favored by motorcycle officers.

Equipment
The service pistol of the NMSP was the Smith & Wesson .357, S&W 45, Glock22 .40, Glock31 .357 until 2013 when they converted to the Smith & Wesson M&P in 9mm.

Organization
The New Mexico State Police is under the command of the Chief of the State Police. The Chief is appointed by the Cabinet Secretary of the New Mexico Department of Public Safety, with the approval of the New Mexico State Senate. The Chief is assisted by two Deputy Chiefs. The Chief and Deputy Chiefs supervise a command staff of five Police Majors who serve as the Bureau Commanders of the State Police.

The Chief serves as the Deputy Secretary of Operations for the New Mexico Department of Public Safety, the Department's third highest-ranking member.

Rank structure

Headquarters
NMSP is headquartered with the New Mexico Department of Public Safety at 4491 Cerrillos Road in Santa Fe, NM; this location also hosts the New Mexico Law Enforcement Academy.

Districts
For operational purposes, the State Police divide New Mexico into 12 distinct Districts. Each district has a main office with a commanding officer who oversees day-to-day operations.

 District 1, Santa Fe
 District 2, Las Vegas
 District 3, Roswell
 District 4, Las Cruces
 District 5, Albuquerque
 District 6, Gallup
 District 7, Española
 District 8, Alamogordo
 District 9, Clovis
 District 10, Farmington
 District 11, Socorro
 District 12, Deming

Senate Bill 95 DPS Reorganization Bill
On July 1, 2015, the Motor Transportation Police Division (MTD) and the Special Investigation Division (SID) were merged within the State Police Division per the legislative action. Officers and Agents are now commissioned as New Mexico State Police officers and were removed from the state's employee classified system into the exempt system. The State Police is currently in the process to figure the most efficient and fiscally responsible way to implement uniform, vehicle and policy changes for all commissioned officers. As of November 2015, the decision to change all DPS vehicles and uniforms to match the current State Police identity was issued by the chief. Larger districts such as Albuquerque and Las Cruces will see cars, uniforms and badges issued out to the field first.

As of early 2017 all uniforms, badges and most vehicles (older higher mileage units being phased out) have been replaced with the traditional New Mexico State Police identity.

Duties

All commissioned New Mexico State Police Officers are vested with full statewide criminal, traffic and other duties as delegated by New Mexico Statutes. The most common State Police officers that the public observe on a day-to-day basis are officers from the Uniform Bureau. NMSP has three distinct Bureaus each responsible for the overall NMSP mission but serve different capacities in the carrying out of the goals of the department. The Uniform Bureau is responsible for patrol related activities such as answering calls for service, traffic enforcement and many other field related duties.

The Investigations Bureau serves as the department's investigative body and can bring specialized resources and experience to more complex and felonious level crimes.

The Special Operations Bureau is responsible for tactical level type of resources and managing of internal processes to include Fleet and Special Projects. Many of the members of the different specialized teams are part time members that are activated for that particular type of mission. Some specialized teams such as TACT, EOD and K-9 have full time members that are assigned to the team.

Specialized Divisions/Bureaus of the New Mexico State Police include:
 Tactical Team (Special Weapons and Tactics)
 Explosive Ordnance Disposal (EOD)
 Criminal Interdiction Unit (K-9 Narcotics and EOD/Patrol Working Dogs)
 Investigations Bureau (Narcotics, Impact, Cold Case, Fugitive Apprehension Response Team)
 Crime Scene
 Pistol Team
 Drone Team
 Crash Reconstruction Unit
 Commercial Vehicle Enforcement 
 Crisis Negotiation Team 
 Motors Team 
 Bicycle Team 
 Governors Protection Detail
 NMSP Aviation Unit (Rotary and Fixed Wing)
 DUI and Traffic Units
 Research and Development
 Internal Affairs
 Special Projects
 Community Engagement Unit
 Fleet 
 Honor Guard
 Search and Recovery Team (Dive Team)
 Emergency Response Team (Riots, Public Order disturbances)

Fallen officers
Twenty-eight officers have died in the line of duty.

See also

 List of law enforcement agencies in New Mexico
 New Mexico Mounted Patrol
 State police
 State patrol
 Highway patrol

References

External links
 New Mexico State Police Website

State law enforcement agencies of New Mexico
Government agencies established in 1905
1905 establishments in New Mexico Territory